Stéphane Galifi (born January 14, 1978 in Nogent-sur-Marne) is a professional squash player who represents Italy. He reached a career-high world ranking of World No. 40 in July 2005.

References

External links 
 
 
 

Italian male squash players
Living people
1978 births